The following is a list of the 22 boards of cooperative educational services (BOCES) in the State of Colorado of the United States.

Colorado BOCES
Adams County Board of Cooperative Services website
Centennial Board of Cooperative Educational Services website
East Central Board of Cooperative Educational Services website
Expeditionary Learning School Board of Cooperative Educational Services website
Front Range Board of Cooperative Educational Services website
Grand Valley Board of Cooperative Educational Services BOCES
Larimer Board of Cooperative Educational Services BOCES
Mount Evans Board of Cooperative Educational Services BOCES
Mountain Board of Cooperative Educational Services website
Northeast Board of Cooperative Educational Services website
Northwest Colorado Board of Cooperative Educational Services website
Pikes Peak Board of Cooperative Educational Services website
Rio Blanco Board of Cooperative Educational Services website
San Juan Board of Cooperative Services website
San Luis Valley Board of Cooperative Services website
Santa Fe Trail Board of Cooperative Educational Services BOCES
South Central Board of Cooperative Educational Services website
South Platte Valley Board of Cooperative Educational Services
Southeastern Board of Cooperative Educational Services website
Southwest Board of Cooperative Educational Services website
Uncompahgre Board of Cooperative Services website
Ute Pass Special Board of Cooperative Educational Services BOCES

See also
board of cooperative educational services
List of BOCES
List of school districts in Colorado

References

External links
State of Colorado
Department of Education
Colorado K-12 Schools, Districts and BOCES on the Web
Colorado BOCES Association
Colorado BOCES

 
Boards of cooperative educational services